Styrmand Karlsen is a 1958 Danish film directed by Annelise Reenberg.

Cast 
 Johannes Meyer – Captain Vilhelm Hammer
 Frits Helmuth – First mate Knud Karlsen
 Dirch Passer – Valdemar Bøgelund
 Ove Sprogøe – Ole Olsen
 Ghita Nørby – Anne Marie Bøgelund
 Ebbe Langberg – Robert Lemborg
 Emil Hass Christensen – Shipowner J.C. Lemborg
 Bodil Udsen – Olga
 Clara Østø – Dronning Viktoria / The Queen
 Helge Kjærulff-Schmidt – Knudsen
  - Bibiani
 Karl Stegger – Justitsminister
 Jeanne Darville – Jeanette
 Gabriel Axel – Pierre
 Knud Hallest – Captain

References

External links 
 
 
 

Danish comedy films
1950s Danish-language films
1958 films
Films directed by Annelise Reenberg
Films scored by Sven Gyldmark